The National Preparatory School #6 "Antonio Caso" (ENP 6), also known as "Escuela Preparatoria de Coyoacán" (Preparatory School of Coyoacan) belonging to the National Autonomous University of Mexico (UNAM), began operations in 1959. The Spanish name is: Escuela Nacional Preparatoria, Plantel 6 "Antonio Caso".

History

Escuela Nacional Preparatoria 
With the restoration of the Republic of Mexico in 1867, several laws were enacted to further the educational guidelines of the governments of the time, both for orientation and restructuring of elementary education, and instructional media. In the latter sense, the founding of the National Preparatory School (ENP) was one of the most important steps in that historical moment, with special reference to the advancement of education in Mexico. The Public Institution Act, enacted during the administration of President Juarez, noted provisions relating to school education, creating an independent school based on the positive trend exhibited by Dr. Gabino Barreda, who would be part of the drafting committee in the project that was the basis for the founding of the National Preparatory School. The institution was a novelty in traditional education systems: the student would train based on a curriculum covering various cutting-edge encyclopedic knowledge areas. The materials would cover both scientific and humanistic subjects. Justo Sierra conceived of the National Preparatory School as the foundation of the University, its bedrock, its pillar. Since its inception, the National Preparatory School has been an integral part of the University, but in 1914 the two institutions were separated. By 1929, after the mobilization of various sectors of Mexican society, led by scientists, academics, artists and intellectuals, the university received legal status for final reinstatement of the National Preparatory School. Preparatoriana life leads to the development of ideas, the arts, sciences, and it required, more and more rapidly, more and more classrooms that allow for youth centers who aspire to be part of it would be, from that moment, an important cultural project in Mexico in this century: the University. The National High School then occupied buildings and old houses where they would install some new squads, reaching Preparatoria #6 in 1959. The facility would be located in a beautiful colonial building site on Avenida San Cosme Rivera no. 71, known as the House of Masks.

La Casa de los Mascarones 

By the year 1776, in the town of Tacuba, province of Mexico City where wealthy Spanish merchants settled their vacation homes, began the building by Don José Diego Hurtado de Mendoza, Peredo and Vineyard, seventh Earl of Valley Vicomte de Orizaba and San Miguel. When he died in 1771, the farm building was unfinished and remained abandoned until 1822, when it was sold at public auction, to be completed by Canon Manuel Moreno and Jove. It is since 1850 that the building has housed schools, from the College of Our Lady of Guadalupe, to the Science Institute, which closed in 1914 by order of the first Chief of the Constitutionalist Army, Venustiano Carranza, who expelled the Jesuits to take possession of property to the Federal Government and put in the service of the National School Teachers. Meanwhile, the National University of Mexico released the difficult years of the revolution and gained little by little, the principles and values that would give structure and life. Thus, it is from 1921, when he began his summer school courses, a hotbed of much of the faculty and staff that had the university in 1925, makes use of the transfer of space that gives the Secretariat of Public Education in the old wing of the House of Masks, where he shares the old classrooms, courtyards and gardens with a primary school, which takes possession of the place after the evacuation of the School Teachers. In 1926, the Summer School of the University was formally installed in masks. Soon after, in 1929, the University created the School of Music, which led him temporarily in the halls of the summer school. On 10 July the same year, the old Masks building was definitely built of university heritage. However it was in 1940, when a decree of expropriation of the President of the Republic, General Lazaro Cardenas, terminated the trial started in 1914, giving the final University ownership of the old building of the Masks, hosting various university institutions until 1959, when it was occupied by the Preparatoria 6.

Coyoacán 

During the period of rector Dr. Ignacio Chávez Sánchez (1897–1979), the distinguished university began to take shape efforts to build a new building that would house the campus 6 of the National Preparatory School, as the beautiful, old building in San Cosme was insufficient to accommodate the large number of young people who started in their classrooms for college life. In those years, the organization had acquired a property owned by the Mier y Pesado Foundation, located in the beautiful village of Coyoacan, south of the city. Coyo-hua-can, "Place where coyotes abound" in the language of its ancient inhabitants, the Tepanecs have since had a prominent place in history and culture of Mexico. The Lord of Coyoacan, in the social and economic importance of the kingdom, was one of the high officials who accompanied Moctezuma to meet with the Spanish conqueror, and was the site of Coyoacan split the Mexican emperor, after preparing the final assault here of Tenochtitlan.

In this town, producer of fruits and vegetables, was established the vacation home of Hernán Cortés, where he imprisoned and tortured Cuauhtemoc, the last Aztec king. During colonial times, Coyoacán becomes the first political center of New Spain, to form here the Cabildo of Mexico City in 1521. Home to many historical events, arts and culture, Coyoacán is home since February 11, 1964, when it was inaugurated by the then President of the Republic, accompanied by the rector, Dr. Ignacio Chavez, and community of preparatoriana that since then, was to stand by his enthusiasm, his fraternal relations and high academic standards.

Library 
The library has approximately 64,000 books and 54 periodicals titles, same as are the materials most used in the educational work of teachers and students. This collection is constantly updated and verified that the materials cover the contents of the curricula of all subjects. RIU offers catalogs with automated open shelving, book lending, and photocopying.

Gym 
It has an indoor basketball court designed for various uses.

Pool 
The school has two pools (each with boiler) and dressing rooms.

Auditorium 
It has an auditorium where they have held book launches, lectures, recitals and concerts.

Medical Service 
All students entering the UNAM, is by law derechoabiente of the Mexican Social Security Institute (IMSS), also has facilities on campus with dentists and doctors prepared in which the university may receive: general medical consultations, treatments and injections, emergency care, guidance on health issues.
The Dental Service Center provides review and diagnosis, cleaning, guidance on brushing technique, or extractions.

Media library and language lab 
Self-access centers are designed to strengthen the language skills students want to reinforce or learn with the language that is of interest to the university.

Computer labs 
There are 3 computer labs for teaching: the data center, LACE laboratory, and laboratory of UNAM Foundation.
They have Internet access, and its main activity is the provision of classes regarding technical options as also provided to students.

UNAM Baccalaureate 
The project objectives are to improve the quality of teaching practice in laboratories, incorporating ICT in an interactive model that promotes collaborative work.

Experimental Science Labs (LACE) 
In addition to the curriculum laboratories, there are laboratories devoted to experimental work since 1996. Offered at these facilities, as well as biology, chemistry and physics, are some optional subjects: physical chemistry, astronomy and applied computing.

Meteorology club "Helios" 
The program is part of the Baccalaureate Degree for Weather Stations (PEMBU), which is composed of senior high school campuses in the UNAM. They can measure different atmospheric conditions such as temperature, wind speed and direction, air pressure, relative humidity, or daily precipitation. The data for these variables are sent every three hours for the Centre Atmófera Sciences at UNAM.

Educational guidance 
It is an educational service provided to parents and students through various programs such as courses on self-esteem or "workshop for parents."

Sports and physical education 
The subject of Physical Education (P.E.) is compulsory in grades 4 and 5.

Among the sports offered at the ENP 6:
basketball, football, karate, fencing, swimming, volleyball.

Events that perform ENP and UNAM 
There are interscholastic tournaments, PUMA games, or intercollegiate tournaments.

Aesthetics and arts education 
The arts are part of the common core as compulsory, serial and credits in the Curriculum ENP, and contribute significantly the overall development of youth.

Among the subjects taught in SEA:
Contemporary Dance, dance, Regional Mexican, Spanish regional dance, theater, oratory, music (piano, flute, percussion, trumpet, clarinet, saxophone, guitar), student band and choir.

Technical options 
Among the technical options offered by the National Preparatory School in its various campuses, the ENP 6 provides accounting and computing.

Notable graduates from ENP 6 
Damián Alcázar, Mexican actor.
Miguel Ángel Mancera, Mexican politician.
Miguel Herrera, Mexican football player and coach.
Leonardo López Luján, Mexican archaeologist.

References

External links
 

High schools in Mexico City
Schools in Coyoacán